Hyper IgM syndrome describes a group of primary immune deficiency disorders characterized by defective CD40 signaling; via B cells affecting class switch recombination (CSR) and somatic hypermutation. Immunoglobulin (Ig) class switch recombination deficiencies are characterized by elevated serum Immunoglobulin M (IgM) levels and a considerable deficiency in Immunoglobulins G (IgG), A (IgA) and E (IgE). As a consequence, people with HIGM have decreased concentrations of serum IgG and IgA and normal or elevated IgM, leading to increased susceptibility to infections.

Signs and symptoms
Among the presentation consistent with hyper IgM syndrome are the following:

 Infection/Pneumocystis pneumonia (PCP), which is common in infants with hyper IgM syndrome, is a serious illness. PCP is one of the most frequent and severe opportunistic infections in people with weakened immune systems. Many CD40 Ligand Deficiency are first diagnosed after having PCP in their first year of life. The fungus is common and is present in over 70% of healthy people's lungs, however, Hyper IgM patients are not able to fight it off without the administration of Bactrim
 Hepatitis (Hepatitis C)
 Chronic diarrhea
 Hypothyroidism
 Neutropenia
 Arthritis
 Encephalopathy (degenerative)

Cause

Different genetic defects cause HIgM syndrome, the vast majority are inherited as an X-linked recessive genetic trait and most with the condition are male.

IgM is the form of antibody that all B cells produce initially before they undergo class switching due to exposure to a recognized antigen. Healthy B cells efficiently switch to other types of antibodies as needed to attack invading bacteria, viruses, and other pathogens. In people with hyper IgM syndromes, the B cells keep making IgM antibodies because they can't switch to a different antibody. This results in an overproduction of IgM antibodies and an underproduction of IgA, IgG, and IgE.

Pathophysiology
CD40 is a co-stimulatory receptor on B cells that, when bound to CD40 ligand (CD40L), sends a signal to the B-cell receptor. When there is a defect in CD40, this leads to defective T-cell interaction with B cells. Consequently, humoral immune response is affected. Certain insults, usually from encapsulated bacteria and toxin, then have a greater opportunity to damage the body.

Diagnosis
The diagnosis of hyper IgM syndrome can be done via the following methods and tests:
 MRI
 Chest radiography
 Pulmonary function test
 Lymph node test
 Laboratory test (to measure CD40)

Types
Five types of hyper IgM syndrome have been characterized:
 Hyper-IgM syndrome type 1 (X-linked), characterized by mutations of the CD40LG gene. In this type, T cells cannot tell B cells to switch classes.
 Hyper-IgM syndrome type 2 (autosomal recessive), characterized by mutations of the AICDA gene.  In this type, B cells cannot recombine genetic material to change heavy chain production
 Hyper-IgM syndrome type 3 characterized by mutations of the CD40 gene. In this type, B cells cannot receive the signal from T cells to switch classes.
 Hyper-IgM syndrome type 4 which is a defect in class switch recombination downstream of the AICDA gene that does not impair Somatic Hypermutation.
 Hyper-IgM syndrome type 5 characterized by mutations of the UNG gene.

Treatment
In terms of treatment for hyper IgM syndrome, there is the use of allogeneic hematopoietic cell transplantation. Additionally, anti-microbial therapy, use of granulocyte colony-stimulating factor, immunosuppressants, as well as other treatments, may be needed.

See also
 X-linked agammaglobulinemia
 Common variable immunodeficiency (CVID)

References

Further reading

External links 

Genetic disorders by system
Predominantly antibody deficiencies
Rare syndromes